Shyam Narayan Pandey (1907 - 1991) was an Indian poet. His epic Jauhar, depicting the self-sacrifice of Rani Padmini, a queen of Chittor, written in a folk style, became very popular in the decade of 1940-50.

Books
Haldighati
Jauhar
Tumul
Ruupantar
Aarati
Jai Parajay
Gora Vadh
Jai Hanuman
Shivaji Mahakavya
Prashuram

See also 

 Hindi Wikipedia

References

1907 births
1991 deaths
Hindi-language poets
20th-century Indian poets
People from Mau
Indian male poets
People from Chittorgarh district
Poets from Rajasthan
20th-century Indian male writers